Tracy Cordell Jackson (born April 21, 1959) is an American former professional basketball player who played in the National Basketball Association (NBA). He attended Paint Branch High School and the University of Notre Dame.

Jackson was selected in the second round 1981 NBA draft by the Boston Celtics and split the 1981-82 season playing for both them and the Chicago Bulls. His most productive season was in 1982-83 with the Bulls when he participated in 78 games, averaging 6.3 points and 2.3 rebounds per game. The following NBA season (1983-84), his final in the league, consisted of two games with the Indiana Pacers.

External links
NBA stats @ basketballreference.com

1959 births
Living people
African-American basketball players
American expatriate basketball people in Canada
American men's basketball players
Basketball players from Maryland
Boston Celtics draft picks
Boston Celtics players
Chicago Bulls players
Indiana Pacers players
McDonald's High School All-Americans
Notre Dame Fighting Irish men's basketball players
Parade High School All-Americans (boys' basketball)
People from Burtonsville, Maryland
Shooting guards
Sportspeople from Rockville, Maryland
Toronto Tornados players
21st-century African-American people
20th-century African-American sportspeople